Good to Go may refer to:

Film and TV
Good to Go (film), a 1986 film directed by Blaine Novak and starring Art Garfunkel and Robert DoQui
Good to Go (Srečen za umret), 2012 film with Evgen Car

Music
Good to Go (7 Seconds album), a 1999 album by 7 Seconds
Good to Go (Terrorvision album), a 2001 album by Terrorvision
Good to Go (soundtrack), a soundtrack album to the film Good to Go
Good to Go, an EP by Jimmy Eat World
"Good to Go", a song by Elliott Smith from his 1995 album Elliott Smith
"Good to Go", a track from the 1995 Steve Morse Band album Structural Damage
"Good to Go", a track by Hammer from his 1991 album Too Legit to Quit

Other
Good to Go (toll collection system), the toll collection system used by the Washington State Department of Transportation